Karem Ben Hnia (born 13 November 1994) is a Tunisian Olympic weightlifter from the city of Moknine. He represented his country at the 2016 Summer Olympics held in Rio de Janeiro, Brazil. He also represented Tunisia at the 2020 Summer Olympics in Tokyo, Japan. He competed in the men's 73 kg event.

He won gold medals in all three Men's 73 kg events at the 2019 African Games.

References

External links 
 

1994 births
Living people
Tunisian male weightlifters
Olympic weightlifters of Tunisia
Weightlifters at the 2016 Summer Olympics
Weightlifters at the 2020 Summer Olympics
Weightlifters at the 2010 Summer Youth Olympics
African Games gold medalists for Tunisia
African Games medalists in weightlifting
Competitors at the 2015 African Games
Competitors at the 2019 African Games
Mediterranean Games gold medalists for Tunisia
Mediterranean Games silver medalists for Tunisia
Mediterranean Games bronze medalists for Italy
Mediterranean Games medalists in weightlifting
Competitors at the 2013 Mediterranean Games
Competitors at the 2022 Mediterranean Games
21st-century Tunisian people